Charles Dirden III (born November 17, 1970) is an American actor and comedian.

Charles Dirden III was born on November 17, 1970 in Los Angeles, California, USA. He is an actor and comedian, known for What to Do with Your Dead Hooker (2001), Focus (2001) and Let's Meet Those People (2001). He has been married to Lynay Dirden since 2002.

Film

References

1970 births
Living people